Chamaco Ramirez (September 10, 1941 - March 27, 1983) was a Puerto Rican salsa singer and composer. He came to prominence and is still mostly remembered for his work as singer of the Tommy Olivencia Orchestra.

Early years
Ramirez, was born Ramon Luis Ramirez Toro in the Parada 26 section of Santurce, Puerto Rico. A naturally gifted musician since his early youth, at the age of 16 and while still a High School student, he joined Tommy Olivencia to start the orchestra which would bear Olivencia's name and which would later go by the moniker of La Primerisima Orquesta de Puerto Rico.

Tommy Olivencia y Su Orquesta
With Tommy Olivencia y Su Orquesta, in which Ramirez shared vocals with Paquito Guzmán, he would work from 1960 to 1971 and again from 1974 to 1976. He recorded eight albums with this orchestra which are now considered classics of the salsa genre. In the 1960s, while still a member of Tommy Olivencia y Su Orquesta, he also contributed vocals to albums by the Alegre All Stars and Kako and his Orchestra.

Besides his vocal work which was marked by his ability to improvise, he was also a gifted composer who wrote the Salsa classic, Trucutu, later covered by Marc Anthony.

Although having a brief career, Chamaco’s songs with Tommy Olivencia’s orchestra left a lasting legacy among musicians and performers of younger generations. Songs such as "Plante Bandera" and "Evelio Y La Rumba" (both composed by Tite Curet Alonso) were later covered by artists as diverse as Tego Calderon, Tempo Alomar, and Los Soneros Del Barrio.

Later Work
After leaving Tommy Olivencia's orchestra, Ramirez moved to New York City where he worked with the orchestra of Kako Bastar. Later he would move to Los Angeles where he worked with two minor local orchestras. In 1979, he released his first and only solo album, titled Alive and Kicking.

Later years and death
During his later years, Ramirez had frequent problems with the law related to his use of illegal drugs. On the morning of March 27, 1983, he was the victim of a shooting in the Bronx, New York City, and died in an ambulance as he was being taken to the hospital.

Discography

Tommy Olivencia y Su Orquesta 

Trucutu (1965)
Jala-Jala Y Guaguancó (1966)
La Nueva Sensación Musical De Puerto Rico (1967)
Fire Fire -(Fuego)(Fuego)  (1967)
Quito Vélez, Los Montemar, Lo Mejor 1960s  (1971)
Juntos de Nuevo (1974)
Planté Bandera - A Mi Pai Chango (1975)

The Alegre All Stars
Way Out - The Alegre All Stars Vol. 4. (1966)
The Salsa All Stars (1972) 
They Just Don't Makim Like Us Any More (1972)

Kako and His Orchestra
Sock It to Me Latino (1968)

Solo albums
Alive and Kicking (1979)

See also

List of Puerto Ricans

External links

1941 births
1983 deaths
Deaths by firearm in the Bronx
People from Santurce, Puerto Rico
20th-century Puerto Rican male singers
Puerto Rican male composers
Puerto Rican murder victims
Salsa musicians
People murdered in New York City
Male murder victims
20th-century American composers